Dua Al-Ahd is an Arabic language allegiance supplication prayer for Hujjat-Allah al-Mahdi, twelfth Imam of Shia Islam.

Ja'far al-Sadiq narrates in a hadith regarding the importance of reciting the supplication every morning. He stated that: “If one person read the supplication for 40 mornings, will be considered and accounted as helpers of Imam Mahdi and if he dies before the reappearance of Imam al-Mahdi, Allah will raise him up from the grave.” It is common knowledge that reappearance of al-Mahdi takes place alongside Jesus, in effect, the supplication is to seeking reappearance of al-Mahdi and Jesus.

One of the sentences of this supplication is: “O Allah! If my death occurs before his coming, which you have decreed for your servants, then raise me from my grave, wrapped in my shroud, my sword unsheathed, my spear bared, answering the call of the caller in the cities as well as the deserts.”

In the prayer, the Shia pray to Allah that they see Imam Mahdi in their life and consider his helpers. Also, they beseech Allah to solve the problems of their nation and world with Mahdi's reappearance. At the end the reciter says: “Hasten! Hasten! O my Master, O Master of the era.” This phrase refers to the acceleration in the reappearance of the Mahdi.

Arabic text of this supplication
ﺑﺴﻢ ﺍﻟﻠﮧ ﺍﻟﺮﺣﻤﻦ ﺍﻟﺮﺣﯿﻢ
ﺍَﻟﻠّٰﮭُﻢَّ ﺭَﺏَّ ﺍﻟﻨُّﻮﺭِ ﺍﻟْﻌَﻈِﯿﻢِ ِ ، ﻭَﺭَﺏَّ ﺍﻟْﻜُﺮْﺳِﻲِّ ﺍﻟﺮَّﻓﻴﻊِ ، ﻭَﺭَﺏَّ ﺍﻟْﺒَﺤْﺮِ ﺍﻟْﻤَﺴْﺠُﻮﺭِ ، ﻭَﻣُﻨْﺰِﻝَ ﺍﻟﺘَّﻮْﺭﺍﺓِ ﻭَﺍﻻِْﻧْﺠﻴﻞِ ﻭَﺍﻟﺰَّﺑُﻮﺭِ ، ﻭَﺭَﺏَّ ﺍﻟﻈِّﻞِّ ﻭَﺍﻟْﺤَﺮُﻭﺭِ ، ﻭَﻣُﻨْﺰِﻝَ ﺍﻟْﻘُﺮْﺁﻥِ ﺍﻟْﻌَﻈﻴﻢِ ، ﻭَﺭَﺏَّ ﺍﻟْﻤَﻼﺋِﻜَﺔِ ﺍﻟْﻤُﻘَﺮَّﺑﻴﻦَ ﻭَﺍﻻَْﻧْﺒِﻴﺎﺀِ ﻭَﺍﻟْﻤُﺮْﺳَﻠﻴﻦَ ، ﺍَﻟﻠّـﻬُﻢَّ ﺍِﻧّﻲ ﺍَﺳْﺎَﻟُﻚَ ﺑِﺎِﺳْﻤِﻚَ ﺍﻟْﻜَﺮﻳﻢِ ، ﻭَﺑِﻨُﻮﺭِ ﻭَﺟْﻬِﻚَ ﺍﻟْﻤُﻨﻴﺮِ ﻭَﻣُﻠْﻜِﻚَ ﺍﻟْﻘَﺪﻳﻢِ ، ﻳﺎ ﺣَﻲُّ ﻳﺎ ﻗَﻴُّﻮﻡُ ﺍَﺳْﺎَﻟُﻚَ ﺑِﺎﺳْﻤِﻚَ ﺍﻟَّﺬﻱ ﺍَﺷْﺮَﻗَﺖْ ﺑِﻪِ ﺍﻟﺴَّﻤﺎﻭﺍﺕُ ﻭَﺍﻻَْﺭَﺿُﻮﻥَ ، ﻭَﺑِﺎﺳْﻤِﻚَ ﺍﻟَّﺬﻱ ﻳَﺼْﻠَﺢُ ﺑِﻪِ ﺍﻻَْﻭَّﻟُﻮﻥَ ﻭَﺍﻻْﺧِﺮُﻭﻥَ ، ﻳﺎ ﺣَﻴّﺎً ﻗَﺒْﻞَ ﻛُﻞِّ ﺣَﻲٍّ ﻭَﻳﺎ ﺣَﻴّﺎً ﺑَﻌْﺪَ ﻛُﻞِّ ﺣَﻲٍّ ﻭَﻳﺎ ﺣَﻴّﺎً ﺣﻴﻦَ ﻻ ﺣَﻲَّ ﻳﺎ ﻣُﺤْﻴِﻲَ ﺍﻟْﻤَﻮْﺗﻰ ﻭَﻣُﻤﻴﺖَ ﺍﻻَْﺣْﻴﺎﺀِ ، ﻳﺎ ﺣَﻲُّ ﻻ ﺍِﻟـﻪَ ﺍِﻟّﺎ ﺍَﻧْﺖَ ، ﺍَﻟﻠّـﻬُﻢَّ ﺑَﻠِّﻎْ ﻣَﻮْﻻﻧَﺎ ﺍﻻِْﻣﺎﻡَ ﺍﻟْﻬﺎﺩِﻱَ ﺍﻟْﻤَﻬْﺪِﻱَّ ﺍﻟْﻘﺎﺋِﻢَ ﺑِﺎَﻣْﺮِﻙَ ﺻَﻠَﻮﺍﺕُ ﺍﻟﻠﻪِ ﻋَﻠَﻴْﻪِ ﻭ ﻋَﻠﻰ ﺁﺑﺎﺋِﻪِ ﺍﻟﻄّﺎﻫِﺮﻳﻦَ ﻋَﻦْ ﺟَﻤﻴﻊِ ﺍﻟْﻤُﺆْﻣِﻨﻴﻦَ ﻭَﺍﻟْﻤُﺆْﻣِﻨﺎﺕِ ﻓﻲ ﻣَﺸﺎﺭِﻕِ ﺍﻻَْﺭْﺽِ ﻭَﻣَﻐﺎﺭِﺑِﻬﺎ ﺳَﻬْﻠِﻬﺎ ﻭَﺟَﺒَﻠِﻬﺎ ﻭَﺑَﺮِّﻫﺎ ﻭَﺑَﺤْﺮِﻫﺎ ، ﻭَﻋَﻨّﻲ ﻭَﻋَﻦْ ﻭﺍﻟِﺪَﻱَّ ﻣِﻦَ ﺍﻟﺼَّﻠَﻮﺍﺕِ ﺯِﻧَﺔَ ﻋَﺮْﺵِ ﺍﻟﻠﻪِ ﻭَﻣِﺪﺍﺩَ ﻛَﻠِﻤﺎﺗِﻪِ ، ﻭَﻣﺎ ﺍَﺣْﺼﺎﻩُ ﻋِﻠْﻤُﻪُ ﻭَﺍَﺣﺎﻁَ ﺑِﻪِ ﻛِﺘﺎﺑُﻪُ ، ﺍَﻟﻠّـﻬُﻢَّ ﺍِﻧّﻲ ﺍُﺟَﺪِّﺩُ ﻟَﻪُ ﻓﻲ ﺻَﺒﻴﺤَﺔِ ﻳَﻮْﻣﻲ ﻫﺬﺍ ﻭَﻣﺎ ﻋِﺸْﺖُ ﻣِﻦْ ﺍَﻳّﺎﻣﻲ ﻋَﻬْﺪﺍً ﻭَﻋَﻘْﺪﺍً ﻭَﺑَﻴْﻌَﺔً ﻟَﻪُ ﻓﻲ ﻋُﻨُﻘﻲ ، ﻻ ﺍَﺣُﻮﻝُ ﻋَﻨْﻬﺎ ﻭَﻻ ﺍَﺯُﻭﻝُ ﺍَﺑَﺪﺍً ، ﺍَﻟﻠّـﻬُﻢَّ ﺍﺟْﻌَﻠْﻨﻲ ﻣِﻦْ ﺍَﻧْﺼﺎﺭِﻩِ ﻭَﺍَﻋْﻮﺍﻧِﻪِ ﻭَﺍﻟﺬّﺍﺑّﻴﻦَ ﻋَﻨْﻪُ ﻭَﺍﻟْﻤُﺴﺎﺭِﻋﻴﻦَ ﺍِﻟَﻴْﻪِ ﻓﻲ ﻗَﻀﺎﺀِ ﺣَﻮﺍﺋِﺠِﻪِ ، ﻭَﺍﻟْﻤُﻤْﺘَﺜِﻠﻴﻦَ ﻻَِﻭﺍﻣِﺮِﻩِ ﻭَﺍﻟُْﻤﺤﺎﻣﻴﻦَ ﻋَﻨْﻪُ ، ﻭَﺍﻟﺴّﺎﺑِﻘﻴﻦَ ﺍِﻟﻰ ﺍِﺭﺍﺩَﺗِﻪِ ﻭَﺍﻟْﻤُﺴْﺘَﺸْﻬَﺪﻳﻦَ ﺑَﻴْﻦَ ﻳَﺪَﻳْﻪِ ، ﺍَﻟﻠّـﻬُﻢَّ ﺍِﻥْ ﺣﺎﻝَ ﺑَﻴْﻨﻲ ﻭَﺑَﻴْﻨَﻪُ ﺍﻟْﻤَﻮْﺕُ ﺍﻟَّﺬﻱ ﺟَﻌَﻠْﺘَﻪُ ﻋَﻠﻰ ﻋِﺒﺎﺩِﻙَ ﺣَﺘْﻤﺎً ﻣَﻘْﻀِﻴّﺎً ﻓَﺎَﺧْﺮِﺟْﻨﻲ ﻣِﻦْ ﻗَﺒْﺮﻱ ﻣُﺆْﺗَﺰِﺭﺍً ﻛَﻔَﻨﻰ ﺷﺎﻫِﺮﺍً ﺳَﻴْﻔﻲ ﻣُﺠَﺮِّﺩﺍً ﻗَﻨﺎﺗﻲ ﻣُﻠَﺒِّﻴﺎً ﺩَﻋْﻮَﺓَ ﺍﻟﺪّﺍﻋﻲ ﻓِﻲ ﺍﻟْﺤﺎﺿِﺮِ ﻭَﺍﻟْﺒﺎﺩﻱ ، ﺍَﻟﻠّـﻬُﻢَّ ﺍَﺭِﻧﻲِ ﺍﻟﻄَّﻠْﻌَﺔَ ﺍﻟﺮَّﺷﻴﺪَﺓَ ، ﻭَﺍﻟْﻐُﺮَّﺓَ ﺍﻟْﺤَﻤﻴﺪَﺓَ ، ﻭَﺍﻛْﺤُﻞْ ﻧﺎﻇِﺮﻱ ﺑِﻨَﻈْﺮَﺓ ﻣﻨِّﻲ ﺍِﻟَﻴْﻪِ ، ﻭَﻋَﺠِّﻞْ ﻓَﺮَﺟَﻪُ ﻭَﺳَﻬِّﻞْ ﻣَﺨْﺮَﺟَﻪُ ، ﻭَﺍَﻭْﺳِﻊْ ﻣَﻨْﻬَﺠَﻪُ ﻭَﺍﺳْﻠُﻚْ ﺑﻲ ﻣَﺤَﺠَّﺘَﻪُ ، ﻭَﺍَﻧْﻔِﺬْ ﺍَﻣْﺮَﻩُ ﻭَﺍﺷْﺪُﺩْ ﺍَﺯْﺭَﻩُ ، ﻭَﺍﻋْﻤُﺮِ ﺍﻟﻠّـﻬُﻢَّ ﺑِﻪِ ﺑِﻼﺩَﻙَ ، ﻭَﺍَﺣْﻲِ ﺑِﻪِ ﻋِﺒﺎﺩَﻙَ ، ﻓَﺎِﻧَّﻚَ ﻗُﻠْﺖَ ﻭَﻗَﻮْﻟُﻚَ ﺍﻟْﺤَﻖُّ : ( ﻇَﻬَﺮَ ﺍﻟْﻔَﺴﺎﺩُ ﻓِﻲ ﺍﻟْﺒَﺮِّ ﻭَﺍﻟْﺒَﺤْﺮِ ﺑِﻤﺎ ﻛَﺴَﺒَﺖْ ﺍَﻳْﺪِﻱ ﺍﻟﻨّﺎﺱِ ) ، ﻓَﺎَﻇْﻬِﺮِ ﺍﻟّﻠﻬُﻢَّ ﻟَﻨﺎ ﻭَﻟِﻴَّﻚَ ﻭَﺍﺑْﻦَ ﺑِﻨْﺖِ ﻧَﺒِﻴِّﻚَ ﺍﻟْﻤُﺴَﻤّﻰ ﺑِﺎﺳْﻢِ ﺭَﺳُﻮﻟِﻚَ ﺣَﺘّﻰ ﻻ ﻳَﻈْﻔَﺮَ ﺑِﺸَﻲْﺀ ﻣِﻦَ ﺍﻟْﺒﺎﻃِﻞِ ﺍِﺍﻟّﺎ ﻣَﺰَّﻗَﻪُ ، ﻭَﻳُﺤِﻖَّ ﺍﻟْﺤَﻖَّ ﻭَﻳُﺤَﻘِّﻘَﻪُ ، ﻭَﺍﺟْﻌَﻠْﻪُ ﺍَﻟﻠّـﻬُﻢَّ ﻣَﻔْﺰَﻋﺎً ﻟِﻤَﻈْﻠُﻮﻡِ ﻋِﺒﺎﺩِﻙَ ، ﻭَﻧﺎﺻِﺮﺍً ﻟِﻤَﻦْ ﻻ ﻳَﺠِﺪُ ﻟَﻪُ ﻧﺎﺻِﺮﺍً ﻏَﻴْﺮَﻙَ ، ﻭَﻣُﺠَﺪِّﺩﺍً ﻟِﻤﺎ ﻋُﻄِّﻞَ ﻣِﻦْ ﺍَﺣْﻜﺎﻡِ ﻛِﺘﺎﺑِﻚَ ، ﻭَﻣُﺸَﻴِّﺪﺍً ﻟِﻤﺎ ﻭَﺭَﺩَ ﻣِﻦْ ﺍَﻋْﻼﻡِ ﺩﻳﻨِﻚَ ﻭَﺳُﻨَﻦِ ﻧَﺒِﻴِّﻚَ ﺻَﻠَّﻰ ﺍﻟﻠﻪُ ﻋَﻠَﻴْﻪِ ﻭَﺁﻟِﻪِ ، ﻭَﺍﺟْﻌَﻠْﻪُ ﺍَﻟﻠّـﻬُﻢَّ ﻣِﻤَّﻦْ ﺣَﺼَّﻨْﺘَﻪُ ﻣِﻦ ﺑَﺄﺱِ ﺍﻟْﻤُﻌْﺘَﺪﻳﻦَ ، ﺍَﻟﻠّـﻬُﻢَّ ﻭَﺳُﺮَّ ﻧَﺒِﻴَّﻚَ ﻣُﺤَﻤَّﺪﺍً ﺻَﻠَّﻰ ﺍﻟﻠﻪُ ﻋَﻠَﻴْﻪِ ﻭَﺁﻟِﻪِ ﺑِﺮُﺅْﻳَﺘِﻪِ ﻭَﻣَﻦْ ﺗَﺒِﻌَﻪُ ﻋَﻠﻰ ﺩَﻋْﻮَﺗِﻪِ ، ﻭَﺍﺭْﺣَﻢِ ﺍﺳْﺘِﻜﺎﻧَﺘَﻨﺎ ﺑَﻌْﺪَﻩُ ، ﺍَﻟﻠّـﻬُﻢَّ ﺍﻛْﺸِﻒْ ﻫﺬِﻩِ ﺍﻟْﻐُﻤَّﺔَ ﻋَﻦْ ﻫﺬِﻩِ ﺍﻻُْﻣَّﺔِ ﺑِﺤُﻀُﻮﺭِﻩِ ، ﻭَﻋَﺠِّﻞْ ﻟَﻨﺎ ﻇُﻬُﻮﺭَﻩُ ، ﺍِﻧَّﻬُﻢْ ﻳَﺮَﻭْﻧَﻪُ ﺑَﻌﻴﺪﺍً ﻭَﻧَﺮﺍﻩُ ﻗَﺮﻳﺒﺎً ، ﺑِﺮَﺣْﻤَﺘِـﻚَ ﻳـﺎ ﺍَﺭْﺣَﻢَ ﺍﻟﺮّﺍﺣِﻤﻴﻦَ

Then one should gently strike his right thigh with his palm and say:  ﺍَﻟْﻌَﺠَﻞَ ﺍﻟْﻌَﺠَﻞَ ﻳﺎ ﻣَﻮْﻻﻯَ ﻳﺎ ﺻﺎﺣِﺐَ ﺍﻟﺰَّﻣﺎﻥ

See also

Reappearance of Hujjat Allah al-Mahdi
Dua Al-Faraj
 Dua Allahumma kun li-waliyyik
Dua An-Nudbah

References 

Shia Islam
Islamic prayer
Shia prayers
Salah terminology
Mahdism